The Hardangerfjord is the fifth longest fjord in the world, and the second longest fjord in Norway.  It is located in Vestland county in the Hardanger region.  The fjord stretches  from the Atlantic Ocean into the mountainous interior of Norway along the Hardangervidda plateau.  The innermost point of the fjord reaches the town of Odda.

Location
Here the fjord heads in a northeasterly direction between the island of Bømlo and the mainland. It passes by the larger islands of Stord, Tysnesøya, and Varaldsøy on the north/west side and the Folgefonna peninsula on the south/east side. Once it is surrounded by the mainland, it begins to branch off into smaller fjords that reach inwards towards the grand Hardangervidda mountain plateau. Its maximum depth is more than  just outside the village of Norheimsund in the middle of the fjord.

Norway's third largest glacier is found on the Folgefonna peninsula, along of the Hardangerfjord.

The area of the fjord is divided among several municipalities in Vestland county: Bømlo, Eidfjord, Etne, Kvam, Kvinnherad, Stord, Sveio, Tysnes, Ullensvang, Ulvik, and Voss.

History
About 8,000 BC, the Scandinavian land mass started to rise up as enormous glacial ice started to melt. The lower parts of the valleys became flooded, and so created what we today know as the Hardangerfjord. The valley was originally not only made through glacial erosion but by the high pressure melting water which pushed its way beneath the ice.

The history of the fjord goes far beyond its Viking history, back to the time of hunters on the surrounding mountains, and later on, farming along this fertile area which today is considered the "fruit orchard of Norway". Later the fjord became the birthplace for a large tourism influx to Norway, and in 1875 Thomas Cook started weekly cruise departures from London to the Hardangerfjord, due to its spectacular nature, glaciers, and grand waterfalls. Soon after this, many of the major waterfalls became the power source for large industries in fjord settlements such as the town of Odda.

Economy
Hardangerfjord has recently seen an increase in tourism. New infrastructure was built for travelers and the location has once again become an industry for the local communities along the fjord.

The fjord has good conditions for fish farming. Fish farms yearly produce more than 40,000 tons of salmon and rainbow trout which makes the Hardangerfjord one of four major fish farming regions in the world.

Hardangerfjord's melt-water is also bottled at source to form the product Isklar, sold worldwide.

Geography

There are many fjord arms that branch off of the main Hardangerfjord.  There are also certain sections of the main fjord that have special names.  Below is a list of the sections of the fjord and the arms that branch off them.
From west to east:
Bømlafjorden (west entrance to the fjord)
Børøyfjorden (branches to the north)
Stokksundet (branches to the north)
Bjøafjorden (branches to the south)
Husnesfjorden (around the Husnes area)
Onarheimsfjorden (around the Onarheim area)
Lukksundet (branches to the north)
Kvinnheradsfjorden (around the Rosendal area)
Øynefjorden (branches to the north)
Sildefjorden (around the island of Varaldsøy)
Maurangsfjorden (branches to the east)
Hissfjorden (around the Kysnesstranda area)
Strandebarmsbukta (bay to the north)
Ytre Samlafjorden (around the Norheimsund area)
Fyksesundet (branches to the north)
Indre Samlafjorden (around the Ålvik area)
Utnefjorden (around the Utne area)
Granvin Fjord (branches to the north)
Sørfjorden (branches to the south)
Eid Fjord (around the Eidfjord area)
Osa Fjord (branches to the north)
Ulvikafjorden (branches off the Osa Fjord to the northwest)
Simadal Fjord (branches to the northeast)

See also 
 List of Norwegian fjords

References

External links 

Svein Ulvund's photo collection (Use the search feature: Hardanger)

Fjords of Vestland
Eidfjord
Ullensvang
Kvam
Kvinnherad
Sveio
Tysnes
Stord
Bømlo
Etne
Voss
Ulvik